Eurhythma callipepla is a moth in the family Crambidae. It was described by Turner in 1915. It is found in Australia, where it has been recorded from the Northern Territories.

The wingspan is about 12 mm. The forewings are dark-fuscous with snow-white markings. The hindwings are white with a pale-fuscous line.

References

Crambinae
Moths described in 1915